Uluköy (literally "almighty village" in Turkish) may refer to the following places in Turkey:

 Uluköy, Bartın, a village in the district of Bartın, Bartın Province
 Uluköy, Çerkeş
 Uluköy, Dinar, a village in the district of Dinar, Afyonkarahisar Province
 Uluköy, Ezine
 Uluköy, Erzincan
 Uluköy, Hocalar, a village in the district of Hocalar, Afyonkarahisar Province
 Uluköy, İnebolu, a village
 Uluköy, Nallıhan, a village in the district of Nallıhan, Ankara Province
 Uluköy, Taşova, a town in the district of Taşova, Amasya Province
 Uluköy, Ulus, a village in the district of Ulus, Bartın Province
Uluköy, a town in the Samsun Province, Turkey
 Uluköy Dam